Sir Charles Wentworth Dilke, 1st Baronet (18 February 1810 – 10 May 1869), was an English art patron, horticulturalist and Whig politician. He is best remembered as one of the chief promoters of the Great Exhibition of 1851.

Background and education
Dilke was born in London, the son of Charles Wentworth Dilke, proprietor and editor of the Athenaeum, by his wife Maria Dove Walker. He was educated at Westminster School and Trinity Hall, Cambridge. He helped pass the parliamentary Reform Act of 1832, enacted under the Whig administration of Lord Grey. He studied law, and in 1834 took his degree of LL.B., but did not practise.

Public life
Dilke assisted his father in his literary work, and was for some years chairman of the council of the Society of Arts, besides taking a prominent part in the affairs of the Royal Horticultural Society and other bodies. In 1841 he co-founded The Gardeners' Chronicle alongside Joseph Paxton, John Lindley and William Bradbury. He was one of the most zealous promoters of the Great Exhibition of 1851 (of which Paxton was again an integral part), and a member of the executive committee. At the close of the exhibition, he was honoured by foreign sovereigns, and the queen offered him knighthood, which, however, he did not accept. He also declined a large remuneration offered by the royal commission. In 1853 Dilke was one of the English commissioners at the New York Industrial Exhibition, and prepared a report on it. He again declined to receive any monetary reward for his services.

Dilke was appointed one of the five royal commissioners for the Great Exhibition of 1862. Soon after the death of the prince consort he was created a baronet, of Sloane Street in the County of Middlesex. In 1865 he entered parliament as member for Wallingford, a seat he held until 1868. In 1869 he was sent to Russia as a representative of England at the horticultural exhibition held at St Petersburg. His health, however, had been for some time failing, and he died suddenly in that city, on 10 May 1869. A selection from his writings, Papers of a Critic (2 vols., 1875), contains a biographical sketch by his eldest son Charles.

Family

Dilke married Mary Chatfield, daughter of William Chatfield, in 1840. She died in September 1853. Dilke was succeeded in the baronetcy by his eldest son, Charles, whose promising political career was destroyed by a well-publicised divorce case in the 1880s. Dilke's younger son Ashton Wentworth Dilke was also a politician.

Honours
In 1871, English botanist Maxwell T. Masters published a genus of plants from tropical South America called Dilkea after Wentworth Dilke.

References

External links 
 
 

1810 births
1869 deaths
Members of the Parliament of the United Kingdom for English constituencies
UK MPs 1865–1868
Baronets in the Baronetage of the United Kingdom
Alumni of Trinity Hall, Cambridge
People educated at Westminster School, London